The 11th Airlift Squadron is an inactive United States Air Force  unit.  It was most recently part of the 375th Airlift Wing as Scott Air Force Base, Illinois.  It operated McDonnell Douglas C-9 Nightingale aircraft conducting medical evacuation missions.

History

World War II
The first predecessor of the squadron was organized in April 1942 at  Hensley Field, Texas as the 11th Air Corps Ferrying Squadron and assigned to the Middle West Sector of Air Corps Ferrying Command's Domestic Wing.  Hensley, located in Grand Prairie, Texas was the location of a Chance Vought Aircraft factory, and a short distance from Fort Worth Army Air Field, where Consolidated Aircraft had a plant.  The 11th ferried aircraft from the factories to modification centers and operational units mostly within the Continental United States from, April 1942-March 1944.

Aeromedical airlift

In 1956, Military Air Transport Service replaced its table of distribution (4-digit) aeromedical evacuation units with permanent units.  As part of this action, the 1731st Air Transport Squadron (Aeromedical Evacuation), which had been organized at Scott Air Force Base, Illinois on 1 June 1952, was discontinued and its personnel and Convair C-131 Samaritans were transferred to the newly-activated 11th Aeromedical Transport Squadron.

The squadron missions included transport of wounded Afghan soldiers and civilians from 1986 to 1987."

Lineage
 11th Ferrying Squadron
 Constituted as the 11th Air Corps Ferrying Squadron on 18 February 1942
 Activated on 16 April 1942
 Redesignated 11th Ferrying Squadron on 12 May 1943
 Disbanded on 1 April 1944. 
 Reconstituted and consolidated with the 11th Aeromedical Airlift Squadron as the 11th Aeromedical Airlift Squadron on 19 September 1985

 11th Airlift Squadron
 Constituted as the 11th Aeromedical Transport Squadron, Light on 18 October 1956
 Activated on 8 November 1956
 Redesignated: 11th Aeromedical Transport Squadron on 25 July 1964
 Redesignated 11th Aeromedical Airlift Squadron on 12 January 1966
 Consolidated with the 11th Ferrying Squadron on 19 September 1985
 Redesignated 11th Airlift Squadron on 1 October 1993
 Inactivated on 30 September 2003

Assignments
 [Middle West Sector, Air Corps Ferrying Command (later] Middle West Sector, Domestic Wing, AAF Ferrying Command, 5th Ferrying Group]), 16 April 1942 – 1 April 1944
 1st Aeromedical Transport Group, 8 November 1956
 1405th Aeromedical Transport Wing, 8 June 1964
 375th Aeromedical Airlift Wing (later 375th Military Airlift Wing), 12 January 1966
 375th Operations Group, 1 December 1991 – 30 September 2003

Stations
 Hensley Field, Texas, 16 April 1942
 Love Field, Texas, 8 September 1942 – 1 April 1944
 Scott Air Force Base, Illinois, 8 Nov 1956 – 30 September 2003

Aircraft
 Convair C-131 Samaritan (1956–1970)
 Douglas C-118 Liftmaster (1956–1970)
 Douglas C-9 Nightingale (1968–2005)

References

Notes

Bibliography

 
 

0011